The Museum of Sydney is a historical collection and exhibit, built on the ruins of the house of New South Wales' first Governor, Arthur Phillip, on the present-day corner of Phillip and Bridge Street, Sydney.

Description
The original house, which was Australia's first Government House, was built in 1788 and later abandoned.  The foundations were exposed by archaeologists in 1983. The new museum building on the site was designed by Denton Corker Marshall architects. The museum was built as part of the Governor Phillip Tower development and is managed by the Historic Houses Trust of New South Wales.

The Museum of Sydney explores colonial and contemporary Sydney through objects, pictures, and new digital media techniques. Panoramic views of Sydney— from 1788 until today— stretch across walls and video screens. Sydney's convict era is explored in a giant showcase of goods and chattels recovered from more than 25 archaeological digs.

Origins of the name
When it was commissioned, the project was called the First Government House Museum. While the museum building was under construction in November 1993, the New South Wales Minister for the Arts announced that the museum would be known as the Museum of Sydney on the Site of First Government House, described in the press at the time as a "mouthful" and commonly contracted to The Museum of Sydney. The change of name attracted protests.

Forecourt

The public entrance to the museum is via First Government House Place in Bridge Street, Sydney. The outline of Phillip's residence, the first Government House, is marked out on the plaza with inlaid stone. Excavation of the site revealed examples of covered drains dated to the late 1790s and brick barrel drains dated to circa 1811 and another to circa 1828.  The remains of the drains and privies are shown in their original context, along with other archeological artifacts, in glass display cases built into the pavement of the forecourt.

See also
 Culture of Sydney
 History of Sydney

References

External links
 
Museum of Sydney, Archived website, on the Site of First Government House landing page at The Historic Houses Trust.
  [CC-By-SA] 
 [CC-By-SA]

Sydney
Museums in Sydney
History museums in Australia
Historic Houses Trust of New South Wales
Bridge Street, Sydney